A housing affordability index is an index that rates housing affordability.

United States
One index is published monthly by the National Association of Realtors. A value of 100 means that a family with the median income has exactly enough income to qualify for a mortgage on a median-priced home.

An index above 100 signifies that family earning the median income has more than enough income to qualify for a mortgage loan on a median-priced home, assuming a 20 percent down payment and a qualifying ratio of 25 percent.

For example, a composite HAI of 120.0 means a family earning the median family income has 120% of the income necessary to qualify for a conventional loan covering 80 percent of a median-priced existing single-family home. National as well as regional data is published.

Another index is the NAHB/Wells Fargo Housing Opportunity Index (HOI) published by the National Association of Home Builders (NAHB) and Wells Fargo. The index measures the number of houses sold in an area that were deemed affordable based on income and housing costs. Both national data and data by metropolitan area are published.

References

External links

Worldwide
 Worldwide Housing Affordability Index

United States
 Housing Affordability Index

Australia
 HIA Housing Report A quarterly review of the recent trends in house prices and housing affordability

Real estate in the United States
Purchasing power